Karlslunde is a suburb 25 km (16 mi) south-west of central Copenhagen, Denmark. The suburb is a part of Greve municipality. Karlslunde is generally divided into Karlslunde Landsby and Karlslunde Strand split by Karlslunde Landevej (Taastrupvejen). The suburb is connected with the S-train network lines A and E. 

The city has quite a rich history, as the viking Svend-Grate fought a vital battle against the Vends in Karlslunde in the year of 1153. Karlslunde was also part of Tunestillingen which was a defensive line to protect Copenhagen against a possible attack from the germans under World War I. Mosede Fort (also in Karlslunde) is an old fort which was a key part of this defensive line. Mosede Fort also has a very interesting interactive museum where you can learn more about Tunestillingen and the central role Karlslunde played in it.

Notable People 
 Simon Rieche Taarning (born 1763 in Weissheim, Germany) a German priest who came to Karlslunde in the early 1800s. Known for having 21 children with 21 wives all in Karlslunde
 Vilhelm Pedersen (born 1820 in Karlslunde – 1859) a painter and illustrator of the fairy tales of Hans Christian Andersen
 Hans Tholstrup (1901 in Karlslunde – 1946) a Danish sailor, competed at the 1936 Summer Olympics
 Michael Christensen (born 1990 in Karlslunde) a Danish racing driver

Copenhagen metropolitan area
Greve Municipality

https://www.youtube.com/watch?v=8ehYRPjZ1nU&t=1s